Rehina Myloserdova (born 9 June 1973) is a Ukrainian volleyball player.

She was part of the Ukraine women's national volleyball team at the 1996 Summer Olympics.

References

External links
 
 
 
 http://www.todor66.com/volleyball/Olympics/Women_1996.html

1973 births
Living people
Ukrainian women's volleyball players
Place of birth missing (living people)
Volleyball players at the 1996 Summer Olympics
Olympic volleyball players of Ukraine